Bagger 288 (Excavator 288), built by the German company Krupp for the energy and mining firm Rheinbraun, is a bucket-wheel excavator or mobile strip mining machine.

When its construction was completed in 1978, Bagger 288 superseded Big Muskie as the heaviest land vehicle in the world, at 13,500 tons. It took five years to design and manufacture and five years to assemble, with total cost reaching $100 million. In 1995, it was itself superseded by the slightly heavier Bagger 293 (14,200 tons).  NASA's Crawler-Transporter remains the largest self-propelled land vehicle in the world, since bucket-wheel excavators are powered by an external power source, and the Overburden Conveyor Bridge F60s hold the title of largest land vehicle of any type by physical dimensions.

Objective 
The Bagger 288 was built for the job of removing overburden before coal mining at the Hambach surface mine in Germany. The coal produced in one day fills 2400 coal wagons. The excavator is up to 220 m (721 ft) long (slightly shorter than Baggers 287 and 293) and approximately 96 m (315 feet) high. The Bagger's operation requires 16.56 megawatts of externally supplied electricity. The large surface area of the tracks means the ground pressure of the Bagger 288 is very small (1.71 bar or 24.8 psi); this allows the excavator to travel over gravel, earth and even grass without leaving a significant track. It has a minimum turning radius of approximately 50 metres, and can climb a maximum gradient of 1:18 (5° incline).

By February 2001, the excavator had completely exposed the coal source at the Tagebau Hambach mine and was no longer needed there. In three weeks it made a  trip to the Tagebau Garzweiler, travelling across Autobahn 61, the river Erft, a railroad line, and several roads. The move cost nearly 15 million German marks and required a team of seventy workers. Rivers were crossed by placing large steel pipes for the water to flow through and providing a smooth surface over the pipes with rocks and gravel. Special grass was seeded to smooth its passage over valuable terrain. Moving Bagger 288 in one piece was more economical than disassembling the excavator and moving it piece by piece.

The Bagger 288 is one of a group of similar sized and built vehicles, such as Bagger 281 (built in 1958), Bagger 285 (1975), Bagger 287 (1976), Bagger 293 (1995), etc.

In popular culture 
 In 2009,  the British comedian Joel Veitch published a song dedicated to the Bagger 288 on the album "Spongs In the Key of Life". In the lyrics of the song, Bagger 288 is built to protect mankind from Godzillas and doom robots from the future. In the music video, the song is accompanied by clips from a German TV documentary about bucket excavators in the Ruhr area. 
 In the film Ghost Rider: Spirit of Vengeance (2012), the rider possesses a Bagger 288 turning it into a fiery vehicle of destruction against his enemies.
In the Book After the Revolution by Robert Evans, the post-human city "The City of Wheels" is built on a Bagger 288.

See also 
 List of largest machines

Notes

External links 
 Additional pictures 1 and 2
 Bagger 288 crossing the river Erft during the 2001 move (pictures)
 Manufacturer's homepage 

Bucket-wheel excavators
Coal mining in Germany
Krupp
1978 establishments in West Germany
Vehicles introduced in 1978

ja:バケットホイールエクスカベーター#Bagger 288